Gay Community News (GCN) is Ireland's longest-running lesbian, gay, bisexual, and transgender (LGBT) publication; it is based in Dublin, and founded in 1988. It has been referred to as the "paper of record" for the Irish LGBT community.

History
In the late 1980s, activists Tonie Walsh and Catherine Glendon sought to establish a free LGBT publication. The National Gay Federation (now National LGBT Federation) had previously published two unsuccessful LGBT periodicals, but agreed to establish an LGBT newspaper. GCN's first issue was published on 10 February 1988 as an eight-page tabloid newspaper. This first issue was designed by Niall Sweeney  and in the 1990s was printed by The Meath Chronicle. It has been published consistently each month, with one exception. Its distribution was primarily through the pubs and clubs associated with the LGBT community, as well as other LGBT friendly spaces such as student unions, some books shops, and community and arts centres.

GCN is owned and published by the National LGBT Federation (NXF), which is a voluntary organisation. GCN was originally funded by the Irish state during the economically difficult 1980s and early 1990, it still carries funding banners from the National Development Plan and Pobal. GCN stated that government and advertising funding did not impact the editorial choices of the publication. During the early 1990s, prominent activists and writers, Suzy Byrne and Junior Larkin worked on the publication.

For issue 100, in 1997, GCN sponsored the first Irish Queer Writers Award, which was won in its inaugural year by Micheál Ó Conghaile and Padraig Rooney. During this time, GCN also published a number of collage cartoons by Margaret Lonergan about lesbian culture. By 1998, the publication had 2 full-time members of staff and 21 part-time positions funded by FÁS producing a 38 page freesheet.

The editorial focus of GCN continues to be rights- and community-based. The magazine reports on political developments in Ireland and throughout the world, and is a key source of information for gay men, lesbians, bisexuals and transgender people in Ireland, providing them with details of all community, cultural and social events and initiatives. It is also the only publication in Ireland with regular coverage of developments for HIV positive people. GCN also has regular celebrity interviews, lifestyle features, film, book and music reviews and social columnists.

Brian Finnegan was appointed editor of GCN in March 2003. In July 2003, the GCN was relaunched as a full-colour magazine in an effort to make the publication more commercially viable, with funding from Atlantic Philanthropies. This relaunch led to the publication recording revenues after a number of years of loss. Following the economic downturn in 2008 and the loss of advertising revenue, GCN began to run fundraising campaigns.

GCN's online presence began in 2000. The website was relaunched in January 2014, under the new name TheOutmost.com. The website's title was changed back to GCN to correspond with a redesign of the magazine in 2017.

References

External links
 GCN online
Oral history interview of Tonie Walsh in which he discusses the foundation of GCN

1988 establishments in Ireland
Magazines published in Ireland
Weekly magazines published in Ireland
LGBT-related magazines
LGBT-related mass media in Ireland
Magazines established in 1988
Mass media in Dublin (city)